Sean O'Neill is the name of:

 Seán O'Neill (born 1938), Gaelic football player for Down
 Sean O'Neill (table tennis) (born 1967), American table tennis player and coach
 Seán O'Neill (hurler) (born 1972), Irish hurler for Limerick
 Sean O'Neill (rower) (born 1980), Irish / New Zealand rower
 Sean O'Neill (actor) (born 1985), Canadian, actor and arts professional
 Sean O'Neill (footballer) (born 1988), association footballer
 Sean O'Neill (Louth Gaelic footballer), Gaelic football player for Louth

See also 
 Sean O'Neal (born 1977), actor